SRY (sex determining region Y)-box 30 is a protein that in humans is encoded by the SOX30 gene.

Function

This gene encodes a member of the SOX (SRY-related HMG-box) family of transcription factors involved in the regulation of embryonic development and in the determination of the cell fate. The encoded protein may act as a transcriptional regulator after forming a protein complex with other proteins. The protein may be involved in the differentiation of developing male germ cells. Alternative splicing results in multiple transcript variants. [provided by RefSeq, Jul 2013].

References

Further reading 

Genes
Human proteins